Two International Place is a Postmodern skyscraper in the Financial District of Boston, Massachusetts. The site is located on a site formerly known as Fort Hill. It is located blocks from the North End, the waterfront, South Station, Downtown Crossing, and the Federal Courthouse. The building was designed by Johnson/Burgee Architects – whose principals are Philip Johnson and John Burgee –  and completed in 1992. It is Boston's eleventh-tallest building, standing 538 feet (164 m) tall.

Design and features

Exterior
It consists of a 36-story tower and 13-story annex. It is one of the towers in a complex of five structures, anchored by two towers. The facades are constructed of unpolished rose-granite panels with punched aluminum framed and fixed in-place window openings.  Windows  are a take on tripartite windows but whose lunettes, or arched portions, are fake. A portion of both towers consists of an aluminum framed curtain wall system with a combination of reflective vision glass and spandrel glass. Elaborate classical lighting fixtures are located on exterior.  The building's crown consists of an octagonal-based pyramid surrounded by a ring rising out of the tower and partially up the pyramid. This crown is illuminated at night.

Interior
The Court, located at the center of the complex, features a rain fountain and provides a 25,000 square feet (2,300 m2) retail and café area with restaurants, shops and business services. This court links all the buildings in the complex. Lobby areas feature distinctive imported marble and granite from Spain, Italy and Africa. The interior minimizes columns, greatly enhancing space efficiency and providing work locations with panoramic views. There is secured underground parking with over 800 spaces. There are 38 high-speed passenger elevators and four freight elevators.

Development and maintenance
Project Team
 General Contractor - Turner Construction
 Architects – Philip Johnson and John Burgee 
 Developers – Donald Chiofaro and Theodore Oatis, partners in The Chiofaro Company 
 Equity partner – Prudential Real Estate Investors (PREI)
 Venture Capital partner – The Hillman Company 
 Consulting Engineers – McNamara/Salvia, Inc.
 Lighting Consultant- Claude R. Engle
 Mechanized earth work and Excavation – A.A. Will Corporation, A.A. Will Corporation
 Elevators – Fujitec America, Inc. (Boston)
 Building Maintenance Systems – MANNTECH

See also

List of tallest buildings in Boston
One International Place

References

External links

Property website
 
Emporis
Skyscraper
Chiofaro Company
McCarthy Building Companies project page
 Prudential Real Estate Investors (PREI) announces majority stake in Boston's International Place through a partnership with The Chiofaro Company
McNamara/Salvia Project Page
Claude R. Engle
- A.A. Will Corporation picture of work
Fujitec America project page
Retail Management - Wilder 
Central Artery ramp

John Burgee buildings
Philip Johnson buildings
Office buildings completed in 1992
Skyscraper office buildings in Boston
Financial District, Boston
1992 establishments in Massachusetts